Stenochilus scutulatus is a species of spider in the genus Stenochilus.

References

Araneomorphae
Spiders of Asia
Spiders described in 1974